Culbertson is a village in Hitchcock County, Nebraska, United States. The population was 534 at the 2020 census.

History
Culbertson was founded in 1873 and served as the first county seat of Hitchcock County. It was named in honor of Alexander Culbertson, an Indian agent.   The village of Culberton was incorporated in 1885.

Geography
Culbertson is located at  (40.230260, -100.836224).

Demographics

2010 census
As of the census of 2010, there were 595 people, 257 households, and 174 families residing in the village. The racial makeup of the village was 97.5% White, 0.8% African American, 0.8% from other races, and 0.8% from two or more races. Hispanic or Latino of any race were 1.5% of the population.

There were 257 households, of which 28.8% had children under the age of 18 living with them, 55.3% were married couples living together, 9.7% had a female householder with no husband present, 2.7% had a male householder with no wife present, and 32.3% were non-families. 28.8% of all households were made up of individuals, and 11.7% had someone living alone who was 65 years of age or older. The average household size was 2.32 and the average family size was 2.78.

The median age in the village was 44.5 years. 25.2% of residents were under the age of 18; 4% were between the ages of 18 and 24; 21.5% were from 25 to 44; 30.2% were from 45 to 64; and 19.2% were 65 years of age or older. The gender makeup of the village was 46.7% male and 53.3% female.

2000 census
As of the census of 2000, there were 594 people, 251 households, and 184 families residing in the village. The population density was 702.7 people per square mile (269.8/km2). There were 290 housing units at an average density of 343.1 per square mile (131.7/km2). The racial makeup of the village was 98.32% White, 0.17% African American, 0.34% Native American, and 1.18% from two or more races. Hispanic or Latino of any race were 2.02% of the population.

There were 251 households, out of which 29.1% had children under the age of 18 living with them, 62.5% were married couples living together, 9.2% had a female householder with no husband present, and 26.3% were non-families. 24.3% of all households were made up of individuals, and 14.7% had someone living alone who was 65 years of age or older. The average household size was 2.37 and the average family size was 2.81.

In the village, the population was spread out, with 23.2% under the age of 18, 6.2% from 18 to 24, 23.6% from 25 to 44, 24.7% from 45 to 64, and 22.2% who were 65 years of age or older. The median age was 43 years. For every 100 females, there were 86.2 males. For every 100 females age 18 and over, there were 86.1 males.

As of 2000 the median income for a household in the village was $32,727, and the median income for a family was $39,875. Males had a median income of $31,607 versus $17,212 for females. The per capita income for the village was $16,238. About 3.5% of families and 6.6% of the population were below the poverty line, including 7.1% of those under age 18 and 7.6% of those age 65 or over.

Notable person
 Steve Brooks, jockey. Born in a nearby rural area.
 Carl L. Sackett, Former US Attorney for the District of Wyoming

References

Villages in Hitchcock County, Nebraska
Villages in Nebraska